Amar Singh Thapa Chhetri distinguished as Badakaji Amar Singh Thapa(), or Amar Singh Thapa The Elder, (also spelled Ambar Simha) also known by the honorific name Bada Kaji ("Senior Kaji") or Budha Kaji ("The Old Kaji"), was a Gorkhali military general, governor and warlord in the Kingdom of Nepal. He was the overall commander of the Nepal Army in the conquest of Western Provinces and authoritative ruler of Kumaon, Garhwal  in the Kingdom of Nepal. He was referred by the King of Nepal to have been deployed as Mukhtiyar (equivalent to Prime Minister) of Western Provinces of Kumaon, Garhwal  He is often hailed as Living Tiger of Nepal (jyūm̐do bāgha) and he was posthumously regarded as one of the national heroes of Nepal, who led the Anglo-Nepalese War for the Gorkhali Army. Amarsingh Chowk Pokhara and Shree Amarsingh Model Higher Secondary School are named after the name of Amar Singh Thapa.

Early life and family

He was grandson of Ranjai [of Sirhanchowk] and son of Bhim Sen known as Umrao Bagh Bhim Singh Thapa, who commanded and died in the battle of Palanchowk in 1759 AD. He belonged to Bagale Thapa clan.

He was popularly named "Amar Singh Thapa (Bada)" to distinguish him from another Kaji Amar Singh Thapa (Sana), Mukhtiyar Bhimsen Thapa's father, by identifiers "Bada" and "Sana" meaning elder and younger. His family members were added to the Royal Court by Bhimsen Thapa, who was also a member of Bagale Thapa clan. His eldest son Ranadhoj Thapa was deputy to Mukhtiyar (Prime Minister) Bhimsen Thapa sharing the authority while other four sons namely – Bhaktabir Singh, Narsingh, Ramdas and   Ranjore   Singh, all of them were Kajis at some point. His youngest son Ranajor Singh Thapa fought with him in the Anglo-Nepalese War while his eldest son Ranadhoj Thapa, was vice to Mukhtiyar of Nepal. His grandson, young Surat Singh Thapa, was appointed to post of Kazi in 1832 A.D. to retaliate growing Darbar politics after which the government papers were jointly signed by Mukhtiyar Bhimsen Thapa and Kazi Surath Singh. His two grandsons from eldest son Ranadhoj Thapa, namely – Ripu Mardan and Badal Singh, were both Kaji at some period. Thus, his family was another influential Bagale Thapa family in the Royal Court alongside the premier Bhimsen Thapa family.

Early Conquests
Bada Amar Singh led many conquest battles of Western provinces in the Unification of Nepal. He was leading the conquest of Langur Gadhi in Gadhwal Region before the outbreak of second Sino-Nepalese War (1791–92 A.D.). He reinforced back to Nuwakot travelling around 1000 km in about a month, in defence of Nepalese forces during the second Sino-Nepalese War of 1791–92 A.D. In July 1804, he along with Kaji Dalbhanjan Pande informed the Company's in-charge Daroga about the orders of takeover of Butwal plains and continuation of honoring Palpa's former obligations from the King of Gorkha. After 1806, the territories of Palpa were kept under the military governorship of him and Kaji Dalbhanjan. They set up plans to establish the full Gorkhali authority over the lands by appointing officials and reviewing land grants. The general administration of the region was looked over and revenue collection was regulated by them. He dissolved the Maafi (rent-free) land grants to Jaisi Brahmins in Butwal area for continuation of payments to Gorkhali soldiers.

He commanded the Gorkhali Army with Sardar Bhakti Thapa and Hasti Dal Shah in 1804 against Garhwal Kingdom due to the Garhwal's discontinuance of annual payments to Kingdom of Nepal. The army succeeded in annexing Garhwal to Nepalese territory extending the territory of Nepal up to the Sutlej river in the west.

Bada Amar commanded his troops further to Kangra fort of King Sansar Chand. They rested on Jwalamukhi and ultimately captured the fort. King Sansar Chand aided by 1500 soldiers of Sikh Maharaja Ranjit Singh fought against forces of Amar Singh at Ganesh Valley and retreated back only to attack at the evening. Due to the attack in the evening, Gorkhali Army lost some positions and Bada Amar returned to Sutlej river as per agreement on 24 August 1809 AD. The Gurkhas suffered a strike on their pride but were helpless against the superior Westernized Sikh forces.

He later met Akali Chandan Singh Nihang who converted him to Sikhism. For a few years Amar Singh Thapa led the life of a Sikh hermit although he didn't follow Sikhism completely and was a Sehajdhari Sikh. He wrote a book on his belief in Sikhism called the Adi Bhagvan Prakash which has not been published as of yet and remains in the Nepali State Archives.

Bada Kaji Amar Singh advised Mukhtiyar (Chief Authority) of Nepal, Bhimsen Thapa, to avoid war with the British because he waged war in person and knew the hardships of war. He was one of the senior Bharadars to have opposed the Anglo-Nepalese War due to prevalence of weak administration in the western front suggesting a possible revolt from the general people of the newly conquered western front.

Anglo-Nepalese War

The appointment letter of two of three Subbas (governor) of one-third territories of Garhwal, Surabir Khatri and Ranabir Khatri on Ashadh Badi 2, 1862 V.S. (i.e. June 1805) explained the supreme authority Mukhtiyarship (premiership) of Amar Singh in the Western province: 
Similarly, another appointment letter of Subba of one-third territories of Garhwal, Sardar Chandrabir Kunwar on Ashadh Badi 2, 1862 V.S. (i.e. June 1805), also instructed the governor to act according to the advice of Amar Singh. A British soldier commented to the independent authority of Bada Amar Singh in the western front before the Anglo-Nepalese war:
 When the Kathmandu Durbar solicited Nepalese chiefs' opinions about a possible war with the British, Amar Singh Thapa was not alone in his opposition, declaring that –  He was against the measures adopted in Butwal and Sheeoraj, which he declared to have originated in the selfish views of persons, who scrupled not to involve the nation in war to gratify their personal avarice.

First Campaign
The British columns led by British Generals Rollo Gillespie and David Ochterlony in the Western front faced the defence under the command of Bada Amar Singh. During the first campaign of Anglo-Nepalese War, Badakaji Amar Singh commanded Nepalese army facing columns under Major-General Rollo Gillespie and Colonel David Ochterlony in the Western Front (Kumaon-Gadhwal axis).

He commanded Gorkhali forces to defend the town of Srinagar from The third division army under Major-General Gillespie coming from western side. His son Ranjore Singh Thapa was holding forces at Nahan, the chief town of Sirmaur.

Second Campaign
During the second campaign, he was serving as sector commander of Sindhuli Gadhi and eastern front facing heavy casualties from the assault of Colonel Kelly and Colonel O'Hollorah under Main Operational commander David Ochterlony. His son Ranjore reached Sindhuli Gadhi to defend the fort. The British couldn't reach Sindhuli Gadhi and felt back.

Heritages built

Amar Singh was a religious personality who built many forts across Nepal and India. The original Gangotri Temple at Uttarakhand was built by him, which is part of Chhota Char Dham pilgrimage circuit. He built the oldest temple in the Mithila city Janakpur, Nepal, the Sri Ram Temple. After establishment of full Gorkha authority over Palpa and adjacent Terai, he built the Amar Narayan temple at Tansen in the hills above Butwal in 1807.

Legacy

Bada Kaji Amar Singh is often hailed as Living Lion of Nepal due to his fighting prowess, greater leadership and patriotism. British Historian Hamilton drew comparisons of him with the ancient Carthaginian General Hannibal. A popular patriotic quote in the Nepalese history is attributed to him: 
The letter from the central government of Nepal held the praises of Kaji Amar Singh in the letters to other civil and military officers including provincial governors:
The village of Amaragadhi in western Nepal is named for him. There is a Khukuri sword named after him called Amar Singh Thapa Khukuri. This Khukuri is modeled on the real Khukuri used by him. The real Khukuri used by Amar Singh is archived at National Museum of Nepal and is more curvy in nature than other traditional Khukuris.

Descendants
Amar Singh was married to Dharmabati. Nepali historian Surya Bikram Gyawali contends that he had 9 sons namely: Surbir, Randhoj, Ran Singh, Ranjor, Bhakta Bir, Ram Das, Narsingh, Arjun Singh and Bhupal. He further states that all the sons of Amar Singh contributed to the unification of Nepal. Amar Singh had ten sons from four wives as per the Thapa genealogy: Ranabir, Ranasur, Ranadhoj, Ranabhim, Ranajor, Bhaktabir, Ramdas, Narsingh, Arjun Singh, and Bhupal Singh. The Office of the Nepal Antiquary also mentions sons of Amar Singh as Ranajor, Bhaktavir, Ramdas, Ranasur, Ranabir, Arjun, Narsingh and Bhupal. The genealogical table produced by Nepali historian Kumar Pradhan shows the sons of Bada Amar Singh as - Ranadhoj, Bhaktabir, Narsingh, Ramdas and Ranajor, all of whom were Kaji at some point. His grandsons through daughter Ambika Devi and son-in-law Chandravir Kunwar were Birbhadra Kunwar, a military commander in Kumaunand Balabhadra Kunwar, a national hero of the Battle of Nalapani.

Nepali movie director, Sunil Thapa, who is married to popular Nepali actress Jharana Thapa, is an eighth patrilineal descendant of Bada Kaji Amar Singh making their daughter Nepali actress Suhana Thapa a ninth descendant.

Gallery

Notes

References

Sources
 

 
 

 

 
 

1751 births
1816 deaths
Bagale Thapa
Gurkhas
National heroes of Nepal
Nepalese generals
Nepalese military personnel
People from Gorkha District
People of the Anglo-Nepalese War
People of the Nepalese unification
Thapa Kaji
Nepalese Hindus
Khas people